Yasir Khan (born 13 April 2002) is a Pakistani cricketer who plays for the Quetta Gladiators.

Early life
Khan was born in Bannu in 2002. He spent his early life in Rawalpindi, where he played cricket for five years before joining grade-2 cricket for KP 2nd XI.

Career
Khan made his Twenty20 debut on 28 January 2022. He made his List A debut on 13 March 2022, for Khyber Pakhtunkhwa in the 2021–22 Pakistan Cup.

References

External links
 

2002 births
Living people
Pakistani cricketers
Khyber Pakhtunkhwa cricketers
Peshawar Zalmi cricketers
People from Bannu District